Charles Nolte (November 3, 1923 – January 14, 2010) was an American stage and film actor, director, playwright, and educator.

Career
Nolte was born in Duluth, Minnesota and moved to Wayzata, Minnesota with his family in the early 1930s.  He graduated from Wayzata High School in 1941 and performed in an acting company that later became Old Log Theater.  He studied at the University of Minnesota for two years, then served in the United States Navy from 1943 until 1945.  Upon his return, he enrolled at Yale University and majored in English with a minor in history.

He made his Broadway debut in a production of Antony and Cleopatra, starring Katharine Cornell and featuring Charlton Heston, Maureen Stapleton and Tony Randall. But it was his role in the 1951 Broadway production of Billy Budd playing the title role that garnered him critical attention and acclaim. He appeared in such films as War Paint (1953), The Steel Cage (1954), Ten Seconds to Hell (1959), and Under Ten Flags (1960).

He returned to the University of Minnesota and earned his doctorate in 1966.  He taught at the University of Minnesota from the mid-1960s through the late 1990s.  He wrote the play Do Not Pass Go, which was produced off-Broadway, and wrote the librettos for two operas by Dominick Argento, The Voyage of Edgar Allan Poe and The Dream of Valentino.

Personal life
Nolte's partner of over 50 years was British-American actor and director Terry Kilburn, who is best known internationally for his film work as a child actor in the late 1930s and early 1940s. From 1970 to 1994 Kilburn was artistic director of Oakland University's Meadow Brook Theatre in Rochester, Michigan, which is Michigan's only LORT theatre, and presents classic plays, comedies and musicals. It is known for its annual production of Dickens' A Christmas Carol, which was adapted by Nolte.

In 2009, Nolte donated his personal papers, including his journals, manuscripts, personal photographs, lecture notes, playbills, and films (DVDs and videos), to the Jean-Nickolaus Tretter Collection in Gay, Lesbian, Bisexual and Transgender Studies at the University of Minnesota.

Nolte died in January 2010 at the age of 86.

Filmography

References

External links

 The Charles Nolte Collection for the Performing and Cinematic Arts
 
 

1923 births
2010 deaths
Male actors from Duluth, Minnesota
People from Wayzata, Minnesota
University of Minnesota alumni
American gay actors
Deaths from cancer in Minnesota
Deaths from prostate cancer
United States Navy personnel of World War II
20th-century American male actors
American opera librettists
20th-century American dramatists and playwrights
20th-century American male writers
American male dramatists and playwrights
Yale University alumni
University of Minnesota faculty
21st-century LGBT people
LGBT educators